Blackjack Hill is a summit in Washington County in the U.S. state of Missouri.

Blackjack Hill was named for the blackjack oak in the area.

References

Mountains of Washington County, Missouri
Mountains of Missouri